is a Japanese diplomat. He is the current Japanese Ambassador to China.

References

Ambassadors of Japan to China
Living people
Year of birth missing (living people)